The crest of the ilium (or iliac crest) is the superior border of the wing of ilium and the superiolateral margin of the greater pelvis.

Structure
The iliac crest stretches posteriorly from the anterior superior iliac spine (ASIS) to the posterior superior iliac spine (PSIS).  Behind the ASIS, it divides into an outer and inner lip separated by the intermediate zone.  The outer lip bulges laterally into the iliac tubercle.  
Palpable in its entire length, the crest is convex superiorly but is sinuously curved, being concave inward in front, concave outward behind.

It is thinner at the center than at the extremities.

Development
The iliac crest is derived from endochondral bone.

Function
To the external lip are attached the Tensor fasciae latae, Obliquus externus abdominis, and Latissimus dorsi, and along its whole length the fascia lata; to the intermediate line, the Obliquus internus abdominis.

To the internal lip, the iliac fascia, the Transversus abdominis, Quadratus lumborum, Sacrospinalis, and Iliacus.

 Abdominal external oblique muscle
 Abdominal internal oblique muscle
 Transversus abdominis muscle
 Quadratus lumborum muscle
 Erector spinae
 Iliocostalis pars lumborum
 Longissimus pars thoracis
 Latissimus dorsi
 Tensor fasciae latae
 Iliacus muscle
 Fascia lata
 Iliac fascia
 Transverse fascia

Clinical significance

The iliac crest has a large amount of red bone marrow, and thus it is the site of bone marrow harvests (from both sides) to collect the stem cells used in bone marrow transplantation. The iliac crest is also considered the most ideal donor site for bone grafting when a large quantity of bone is needed. For example, oral and maxillofacial surgeons will often use iliac crest bone to fill in large osseous defects of the oral cavity caused by severe periodontal disease, excess bone resorption following tooth loss, trauma, or congenital defects including alveolar clefts.

The top of the iliac crests also marks the level of the fourth lumbar vertebral body (L4), above or below which lumbar puncture may be performed.

Additional images

See also

 Apollo's belt
 Hip pointer

References

External links

  - "The Back, Posterior View" (#4)

Human anatomy
Bones of the pelvis
Ilium (bone)